Stephen Edward Heretick (born May 29, 1960) is an American politician of the Democratic Party. Heretick represented the 79th district of the Virginia House of Delegates, which includes parts of the cities of Portsmouth and Norfolk, after defeating longtime incumbent Delegate Johnny Joannou in the 2015 Democratic primary. He previously served on the Portsmouth City Council from 2004 to 2012.

Heretick was defeated in the 2021 Democratic primary by Nadarius Clark.

Electoral history

2001

2007

2015

References

External links
Campaign website
Official House of Delegates website

 

Politicians from Portsmouth, Virginia
1960 births
Living people
College of William & Mary alumni
Villanova University alumni
Democratic Party members of the Virginia House of Delegates
Virginia city council members
People from Hopewell, Virginia
21st-century American politicians